The dark-winged lesser house bat (Scotoecus hirundo) is a species of vesper bat. It can be found in Angola, Benin, Cameroon, Central African Republic, Chad, Democratic Republic of the Congo, Republic of Côte d'Ivoire, Ethiopia, Gambia, Ghana, Guinea, Kenya, Malawi, Mozambique, Nigeria, Senegal, Sierra Leone, Somalia, Sudan, Tanzania, Uganda, and Zambia.

References

Scotoecus
Mammals described in 1899
Bats of Africa
Taxa named by William Edward de Winton
Taxonomy articles created by Polbot